Ruth Gillette (August 16, 1906 – May 13, 1994) was an American actress. She appeared in numerous films, TV series and theatrical productions from the 1920s to the 1980s.

Early life
Gillette was born in Chicago in 1906, the daughter of Millard and Goldena Gillette.

Career
Gillette started her career in 1925, acting mainly in musical comedy, debuting in the Broadway musical Gay Paree. During the 1930s she appeared in films like Stage Mother, Frontier Marshal (1939 film), David Harum, Three on a Honeymoon, Wild Gold, Convention Girl, Off to the Races, This Is My Affair, Saratoga and during the 1940s and 1950s she also appeared in films like The Postman Didn't Ring, Coney Island, Nob Hill and In a Lonely Place.

She also appeared in the Broadway productions Babes in Toyland, The Pajama Game, The Gazebo, and 70, Girls, 70.

She subsequently appeared in TV series like The Partridge Family, Madame's Place, Too Close for Comfort and The Facts of Life during the 1970s and 1980s.

Personal life
Gillette was married to composer Harry Archer, they had one son, Robert Gillette Robbins. Archer died in 1960.

On May 13, 1994, Gillette died of lung cancer in Los Angeles, California. Gillette was 87 years old. Gillette was cremated.

Filmography

Film
 Stage Mother (1933) - Blonde (uncredited)
 Frontier Marshal (1934) - Queenie LaVerne
 David Harum (1934) - Lillian Russell (uncredited)
 Three on a Honeymoon (1934) - Mrs. Foster (uncredited)
 I Believed in You (1934) - Woman in Cafe (uncredited)
 Wild Gold (1934) - Dixie Belle
 Woman in the Dark (1934) - Lil Logan
 Life Begins at 40 (1935) - Mrs. Cotton
 Convention Girl (1935) - Helen Shalton
 Silk Hat Kid (1935) - First Tart (uncredited)
 Navy Wife (1935) - Jenny (uncredited)
 The Spanish Cape Mystery (1935) - Laura Constable
 The Great Ziegfeld (1936) - Lillian Russell (uncredited)
 San Francisco (1936) - Earthquake Survivor (uncredited)
 The Gentleman from Louisiana (1936) - Lillian Russell
 Bulldog Edition (1936) - Jailhouse Gertie (uncredited)
 Off to the Races (1937) - Rosabelle
 This Is My Affair (1937) - Blonde
 Saratoga (1937) - Mrs. Pearl Hurley (uncredited)
 Wife, Doctor and Nurse (1937) - Ex-Follies Girl (uncredited)
 In Old Chicago (1938) - Miss Lou
 Rebecca of Sunnybrook Farm (1938) - Melba
 Josette (1938) - Belle
 The Chaser (1938) - Mrs. Olaf Olson
 The Man from Music Mountain (1938) - Madam Fatima (uncredited)
 Slander House (1938) - Mme. Renault
 Pride of the Navy (1939) - Undetermined Role (uncredited)
 Made for Each Other (1939) - Tipsy Blonde at New Year's Eve Party (uncredited)
 The Return of the Cisco Kid (1939) - Flora
 Little Accident (1939) - Woman (uncredited)
 The Monster and the Girl (1941) - Wedding Witness (uncredited)
 For Beauty's Sake (1941) - Fat Woman (uncredited)
 Small Town Deb (1942) - Clerk
 The Postman Didn't Ring (1942) - Secretary (uncredited)
 Street of Chance (1942) - Blonde (uncredited)
 Hello, Frisco, Hello (1943) - Singer (uncredited)
 Coney Island (1943) - Saloon Patron (uncredited)
 Nob Hill (1945) - uncredited
 Everybody Does It (1949) - Mrs. Craig (uncredited)
 In a Lonely Place (1950) - Martha (uncredited)
 The Shaggy D.A. (1976) - Song Chairman
 Going Ape! (1981) - Marianne

Television
 Dennis the Menace - The Lost Dog (1963) TV Episode .... Mrs. Morton
 The Partridge Family - The Last of Howard (1973) TV Episode .... Mrs. Milstead
 Madame's Place - Episode 1.21 (1982) TV Episode .... Mrs. Stewart, III
 Too Close for Comfort - Don't Rock The Boat (1983) TV Episode .... Mrs. Wrigley
 The Facts of Life - Two Guys from Appleton (1985) TV Episode .... Ruth - Grand Opening (1985) TV Episode .... Ruth - Out of Peekskill: Part 1 (1986) TV Episode .... Ruth - Out of Peekskill: Part 2 (1986) TV Episode .... Ruth

Stage
 Gay Paree (1925)
 Babes in Toyland (1930)
 The Pajama Game (1954)
 The Gazebo (1958)
 70, Girls, 70 (1971)

References

External links

 
 

1906 births
1994 deaths
American film actresses
American television actresses
American stage actresses
Actresses from Chicago
20th-century American actresses
Deaths from lung cancer in California